Phil Whitaker (born 1966) is an English novelist and physician. He is also a journalist.

Education and writings
Whitaker, born in Kent, qualified in medicine at the University of Nottingham in 1990 and at the University of Oxford, where he undertook postgraduate training in general practice. He also completed an MA in creative writing at the University of East Anglia in 1996.

Whitaker made his debut with the novel Eclipse of the Sun, which received the 1997 John Llewellyn Rhys Prize and the 1998 Betty Trask Award, and was shortlisted for the 1997 Whitbread First Novel Award. His second novel, Triangulation, won the 2000 Encore Award.

Whitaker writes a regular medical column for the UK weekly New Statesman. He currently lives in Somerset.

Awards
1997 John Llewellyn Rhys Prize, Eclipse of the Sun
1998 Betty Trask Award, Eclipse of the Sun
2000 Encore Award, Triangulation

Bibliography
Eclipse of the Sun (1997)
Triangulation (1999)
The Face (2003)
Freak of Nature (2007)
Sister Sebastian's Library (2016)
You (2018)
Chicken Unga Fever (2018)

References

1966 births
Living people
Alumni of the University of Nottingham
Alumni of the University of Oxford
Alumni of the University of East Anglia
British writers
New Statesman people
People from Somerset